Balham is an interchange station formed of a range of underground entrances for the London Underground ('tube') and a shared entrance with its National Rail station component. The station is in central Balham in the London Borough of Wandsworth, south London, England. The tube can be accessed on each side of the Balham High Road (A24); National Rail on the south side of the road leading east, where the track is on a mixture of light-brick high viaduct and earth embankment, quadruple track and on a brief east–west axis.

It is in Travelcard Zone 3. The conjoined stations are owned and operated separately with different ticket machines and gatelines.

National Rail station

The National Rail station is on the Brighton Main Line, four stops from London Victoria. On a north–south route, the tracks pass through Balham on an approximate east–west axis, with Victoria towards the west. The station is managed by Southern. The platforms are on embankment between bridges over Balham High Road and Bedford Hill. Access to the platforms is via an underpass beneath them. There are four tracks and four platforms. The 05:27 to Milton Keynes Central also starts here.

History
The West End of London and Crystal Palace Railway opened a station named Balham Hill on 1 December 1856, at which time the line ran between Crystal Palace and Wandsworth Common. From the outset the line was worked by the London, Brighton and South Coast Railway, which purchased the line in 1859 after it had been extended to Pimlico.

The original station was on the west side of Balham High Road; it was re-sited by the LB&SCR in 1863 as part of works to widen the line, and improve the route between East Croydon and Victoria. Further remodelling of the line was undertaken in 1890 and 1897 to increase capacity. It was named Balham then renamed Balham and Upper Tooting on 9 March 1927, reverting to Balham on 6 October 1969.

The lines through the station to Crystal Palace were electrified in 1911, by means of the LB&SCR 'Elevated Electric' overhead system. Work on electrifying the remaining services through the station had begun in 1913 but was interrupted by the First World War and not completed until 1925. By this time the LB&SCR had been absorbed into the Southern Railway following the Railways Act 1921. In 1925 the Southern Railway decided to adopt a third rail electrification system and the lines through the station were converted between June 1928 and September 1929.

When sectorisation was introduced in the 1980s, the national rail lines were served by Network SouthEast until the privatisation of the British Railways in the 1990s to the Connex South Central franchise, replaced by the current operator in 2000.

The station has a high brick wall along Balham Station Road on which four cold cast bronze reliefs are mounted and titled "Impressions of Balham". These depict local residents and everyday scenes. They were conceived and constructed by Christine Thomas and Julia Barton and installed in 1991 for Wandsworth Borough Council.

London Underground station
The line and other stations on the extension had opened earlier, on 13 September 1926.

Along with the other stations on the Morden extension, the building was designed by architect Charles Holden. They were Holden's first major project for the Underground. He was selected by Frank Pick, general manager of the Underground Electric Railways Company of London (UERL), to design the stations after he was dissatisfied with designs produced by the UERL's own architect, Stanley Heaps. The Underground station buildings are listed Grade II.

The station has entrances on the east and west sides of Balham High Road linked by a pedestrian subway. The modernist designs of each building take the form of double-height screens clad in white Portland stone with three-part glazed screens in the centres of the façades divided by columns of which the capitals are three-dimensional versions of the Underground roundel. The central panel of the screens contain a large version of the roundel. Balham is the only station on the Morden branch of the Northern Line conjoined to a National Rail station.

Second World War
During the Second World War, Balham was one of many deep tube stations designated for use as a civilian air raid shelter. On the evening of 14 October 1940, a 1,400 kg semi-armour piercing fragmentation bomb fell on the road above the northern end of the platform tunnels, creating a large crater into which an out-of-service bus then crashed. According to the Commonwealth War Graves Commission (CWGC), sixty-six people in the station were killed – although some sources report 64 shelterers and four railway staff were killed, and more than seventy injured. The closed section and station were reopened on 12 January 1941.

In October 2000 a memorial plaque commemorating this event was placed in the station's ticket hall. It stated that 64 people died, which differed from the CWGC register at the time, and other sources. On 14 October 2010 this was replaced with a new commemorative plaque which does not state the number of fatalities. This second plaque was again replaced with an official memorial stone in Welsh slate commissioned by London Underground and that was unveiled on 14 October 2016. The second removed plaque was again deposited with the London Transport Museum.

The bombing of the station during the war is briefly mentioned in Ian McEwan's novel Atonement, while the film based on the book depicts the station's flooding, in which a main character is killed. A character dates the event incorrectly (September in the novel; 15 October in the film). The film also refers to the fracturing of gas mains, as well as water. The bombing of the station is also featured in the children's novel Billy's Blitz by Barbara Mitchelhill when Billy and his family are sheltering in the tube station on the night of 14 October 1940. Ben Aaronvitch's novel Whispers Under Ground also mentions the flooding.

A radio documentary exploring the background to the bombing and events on the day was broadcast on Riverside Radio to mark the 80th anniversary of the bomb on 14 October 2020.

Services

National Rail
All National Rail services at Balham are operated by Southern using  EMUs.

The typical off-peak service in trains per hour is:
 8 tph to 
 2 tph to  via 
 2 tph to  via , of which 1 continues to 
 2 tph to  via 
 2 tph to  via 
 1 tph to 
 1 tph to  via 

During the peak hours, the station is served by an additional half-hourly service between London Victoria and  via Norbury.

On Saturday evenings (after approximately 18:45) and on Sundays, there is no service south of Dorking to Horsham.

London Underground
The typical off-peak London Underground service on the Northern line in trains per hour is:
 10 tph to Edgware via Bank
 2 tph to Mill Hill East via Bank
 8 tph to High Barnet via Bank

During the peak hours, the service is increased to up to 22 tph in each direction, including trains that run via Charing Cross.

Connections
London Buses routes 155, 249, 255, 315, 355 and night route N155 serve the station.

References

External links

London Transport Museum Photographic Archive

 Impressions of Balham PMSA

Northern line stations
Tube stations in the London Borough of Wandsworth
Former City and South London Railway stations
Railway stations in Great Britain opened in 1926
Charles Holden railway stations
Disasters on the London Underground
Railway stations in the London Borough of Wandsworth
Former London, Brighton and South Coast Railway stations
Railway stations in Great Britain opened in 1863
Railway stations served by Govia Thameslink Railway
Art Deco architecture in London
Station
London Underground Night Tube stations
Art Deco railway stations